Jonathan Irvine Israel  (born 26 January 1946) is a British writer and  academic specialising in Dutch history, the Age of Enlightenment and European Jews. Israel was appointed as Andrew W. Mellon Professor in the School of Historical Studies at the Institute for Advanced Study, Princeton, New Jersey, in January 2001 and retired in July 2016. He was previously Professor of Dutch History and Institutions at the University College London.

In recent years, Israel has focused his attention on a multi-volume history of the Age of Enlightenment. He contrasts two camps. The "radical Enlightenment" was founded on a rationalist materialism first articulated by Spinoza. Standing in opposition was a "moderate Enlightenment" which he sees as weakened by its belief in God.

Life 
Israel's career until 2001 unfolded in British academia. He attended Kilburn Grammar School, and like his school peer and future fellow historian Robert Wistrich went on to study History as an undergraduate at Queens' College, Cambridge, graduating with a first-class degree in Part II of the Tripos in 1967. His graduate work took place at the University of Oxford and the El Colegio de México, Mexico City, leading to his D.Phil. from Oxford in 1972. He was named Sir James Knott Research Fellow at the University of Newcastle upon Tyne in 1970, and in 1972 he moved to the University of Hull where he was first an assistant lecturer then a lecturer in Early Modern Europe. In 1974 he became a lecturer in Early Modern European History at University College London, progressing to become a reader in Modern History in 1981, and then to Professor of Dutch History and Institutions in 1984. In January 2001, Israel became a professor of modern European history in the School of Historical Studies at the Institute for Advanced Study, Princeton, New Jersey. In 2007, the 375th anniversary of the birth of Spinoza, he held the Spinoza Chair of Philosophy at the University of Amsterdam.

Works 
Israel has defined what he considers to be the "Radical Enlightenment," arguing it originated with Spinoza. He argues in great detail that Spinoza "and Spinozism were in fact the intellectual backbone of the European Radical Enlightenment everywhere, not only in the Netherlands, Germany, France, Italy, and Scandinavia but also Britain and Ireland", and that the Radical Enlightenment, leaning towards religious skepticism and republican government, leads on to the modern liberal-democratic state.

Israel is sharply critical of Jean-Paul Marat and Maximilien de Robespierre for repudiating the true values of the Radical Enlightenment and grossly distorting the French Revolution.  He argues, "Jacobin ideology and culture under Robespierre was an obsessive Rousseauiste moral Puritanism steeped in authoritarianism, anti-intellectualism, and xenophobia, "and it repudiated free expression, basic human rights, and democracy."

In response to Israel's series on the Enlightenment, writes Johnson Kent Wright, there appeared —
a series of in-depth critiques, from leading practitioners of every stripe, including Theo Verbeek, Harvey Chisick, Anthony La Vopa, Antoine Lilti, Samuel Moyn, and Dan Edelstein.  Though all expressed admiration for the breadth of Israel's reading and display of sheer scholarly stamina, they also reached a strikingly unanimous verdict.  In the eyes of his critics, Israel's interpretation of the Enlightenment is a kind of academic juggernaut, careening destructively through the discipline, in the service of a false idol—Spinoza, supposed demiurge of modernity—and an unsustainable principle—the idea of an umbilical connection between metaphysical monism and political radicalism.

A Marxist defense of Israel against one critic (Samuel Moyn) appeared in 2010 on the World Socialist Web Site, particularly in the article, "The Nation, Jonathan Israel and the Enlightenment".  The two defenders also criticize Israel, saying:
There are problems in his argument. The dichotomy between a radical and moderate Enlightenment, however suggestive and stimulating, tends at times to overly simplify complex and contradictory processes in the development of philosophical thought. It is not always the case, as Professor Israel seems to suggest, that the most significant advances in philosophical thought were made by individuals who held the most politically radical views.

In 2004, in response to a Historisch Nieuwsblad survey, which asked members of the Royal Netherlands Historical Society what were the classic works about Dutch history, The Dutch Republic: Its Rise, Greatness and Fall, 1477–1806 came in second place.

Honors and awards 
He was made a Fellow of the British Academy in 1992, Corresponding Fellow of the Koninklijke Nederlandse Akademie van Wetenschappen (Royal Netherlands Academy of Arts and Sciences) in 1994, won the American Historical Association’s Leo Gershoy Award in 2001, and was made Knight of the Order of the Netherlands Lion in 2004. In 2008, he won the Dr A.H. Heineken Prize for history, medicine, environmental studies and cognitive science.

In 2010 he was awarded the Benjamin Franklin Medal by the Royal Society for the Encouragement of Arts, Manufactures and Commerce (RSA) for his outstanding contribution to Enlightenment scholarship.

Bibliography 

   HB.
   HB;  PB.
   HB;  PB.
   PB.
   HB.
  (editor).  HB;  PB.
  (co-editor)  HB.
   HB;  PB. Documents the golden age of the United Provinces of the Netherlands and its historical context.
   HB.
   HB;  PB. Emphasizes the role of 17th century Holland, and Spinoza in particular, in the Enlightenment.
   HB.
  (co-editor)  HB.
   HB.
   HB.
   HB.
   HB.
   HB.
   HB.

(Radical Enlightenment (2001), Enlightenment Contested (2006), and Democratic Enlightenment (2011) constitute a trilogy on the history of the Radical Enlightenment and the intellectual origins of modern democracy. A Revolution of the Mind (2009) is a shorter work on the same theme.)

See also 
 Counter-Enlightenment
 Comments by Margaret Jacob in "Spinoza Got It", London Review of Books (8 November 2012): 26–27. Israel used the title (but not subtitle) of her book, "The Radical Enlightenment: Pantheists, Freemasons and Republicans", paperback, 2006 (first edition 1981). Also by Jacob: "The Radical Enlightenment and Freemasonry: Where we are now", Philosophica 88 (2013) pp. 13–29.

References

External links 
Seeing reason: Jonathan Israel's radical vision

1946 births
Historians of Europe
Jewish historians
Historians of the Dutch Republic
British Jews
Fellows of the British Academy
Alumni of Queens' College, Cambridge
Alumni of St Antony's College, Oxford
Academics of Newcastle University
Academics of the University of Hull
Members of the Royal Netherlands Academy of Arts and Sciences
Professors of Dutch History at University College London
Institute for Advanced Study faculty
Winners of the Heineken Prize
Knights of the Order of the Netherlands Lion
Living people
Spinoza scholars
Spinozists